Daniel McPherson (born 5 July 1975) is a former Australian rules footballer who played with the Sydney Swans in the Australian Football League. Originally from Matong, a small town in New South Wales, McPherson played for the Swans between 1994 and 2003. He has served as the forward coach of the Melbourne Football Club since October 2013.

After retiring from playing, he turned to coaching, leading North Shore Australian Football Club in the Sydney AFL in 2005. He then joined the Sydney coaching staff and coached the Sydney reserves in the AFL Canberra league in 2010.

References

External links

1975 births
Living people
Australian rules footballers from New South Wales
Sydney Swans players